Events from the year 1899 in the United Kingdom.

Incumbents
 Monarch – Victoria
 Prime Minister – Robert Gascoyne-Cecil, 3rd Marquess of Salisbury (Coalition)
 Parliament – 26th '1899

Events
 6 January – Lord Curzon becomes Viceroy of India.
 25 February – in an accident at Grove Hill, Harrow, Edwin Sewell becomes the world's first driver of a petrol-driven vehicle to be killed; his passenger, Maj. James Richer, dies of injuries three days later.
 9 March – Charles C. Wakefield begins the lubricating oil company which will become Castrol.
 17 March – the world's first wireless distress signal is sent to the East Goodwin light vessel when German cargo ship Elbe runs aground in fog on Goodwin Sands off the Kent coast, bringing assistance from Ramsgate Lifeboat Station. 
 27 March – Guglielmo Marconi successfully transmits a radio signal across the English channel.
 1 May – the National Trust acquires its first part of Wicken Fen, making it the UK's oldest wetland nature reserve.
 17 May – foundation stone of the Victoria and Albert Museum is laid by Queen Victoria, her last public engagement – a week before her 80th birthday. Now in the 62nd year of her reign, she is Britain's longest-serving monarch up to this time.
 Summer 1899: The Central England Temperature sees its 4th hottest summer, at the time, since 1659. It was the hottest summer since 1868. There was also a drought, leading to the 8th driest summer on record, at that time. 
 19 June – Edward Elgar's Enigma Variations premieres in London.
 22 June–27 June – the highest ever recorded cricket score, 628 not out, is made by A. E. J. Collins.
 9 August
 Board of Education Act 1899 establishes Board of Education.
 Elementary Education (Defective and Epileptic Children) Act empowers school authorities to identify and make appropriate educational provision for 'defective' children.
 September – the British Mutoscope and Biograph Company makes King John (a very short silent film) in London, the first known film based on a Shakespeare play.
 6 September 
 White Star Line's transatlantic ocean liner  sails on her maiden voyage.
 Flying Fox completes the English Triple Crown by finishing first in the 2,000 Guineas, Epsom Derby and St Leger.
 9 October – first motor bus in London.
 11 October – Second Boer War begins: In South Africa, a war between the United Kingdom and the Boers of the Transvaal and Orange Free State erupts.
 13 October – Second Boer War: Siege of Mafeking begins.
 20 October – Second Boer War: Battle of Talana Hill: In the first major clash of the conflict, near Dundee, Natal, the British Army drives the Boers from their position, but with heavy casualties, including the commanding general Sir Penn Symons.
 13 November – Bede declared a Doctor of the Church by Pope Leo XIII, the only Englishman so named.
 15 November – the American Line's  becomes the first ocean liner to report her imminent arrival by wireless telegraphy when Marconi's station at The Needles contacts her 66 nautical miles off the coast of England.
 24 November – Mahdist War: Decisive British and Egyptian victory at the Battle of Umm Diwaykarat ends the war in Sudan.
 8 December – the Aldeburgh life-boat capsizes on service: seven of the eighteen crew are killed.
 15 December – Glasgow School of Art opens new building, the most notable work of Charles Rennie Mackintosh.

Undated
 Raising of school leaving age in England and Wales to twelve.
 Seebohm Rowntree undertakes his first York study of poverty.
 Liquorice allsorts first marketed by Bassetts of Sheffield.
 Oxo beef stock cubes introduced by Liebig's Extract of Meat Company.

Publications
 Joseph Conrad's novella Heart of Darkness (three-part serial format).
 E. W. Hornung's first A. J. Raffles novel The Amateur Cracksman.
 Rudyard Kipling's poem The White Man's Burden and his novel Stalky & Co.
 E. Nesbit's children's novel The Story of the Treasure Seekers.
 Clarence Rook's allegedly documentary The Hooligan Nights; Being the Life and Opinions of a Young and Impertinent Criminal Recounted by Himself.
 Somerville and Ross's stories Some Experiences of an Irish R.M. (collected in book form)

Births

 1 January – Jack Beresford, rower (died 1977)
 11 January – Eva Le Gallienne, actress (died 1991)
 17 January – Nevil Shute (Norway), novelist (died 1960 in Australia)
 21 January – John Bodkin Adams, doctor and suspected serial killer (died 1983)
 24 January – Thomas Woodrooffe, naval officer and radio commentator (died 1978)
 3 February – Doris Speed, actress (died 1994)
 30 March – Cyril Radcliffe, lawyer and public servant (died 1977)
 6 May – Billy Cotton, bandleader and singer (died 1969)
 22 May – Binnie Hale, musical theatre performer (died 1984)
 25 May – Kitty Harris, spy for the Soviet Union (died 1966)
 1 June – Edward Charles Titchmarsh, mathematician (died 1963)
 7 June – Elizabeth Bowen, Anglo-Irish novelist (died 1973)
 1 July – Charles Laughton, actor (died 1962)
 13 August – Alfred Hitchcock, film director (died 1980)
 27 August – C. S. Forester, novelist (died 1966)
 24 September – Bessie Braddock, born Elizabeth Bamber, Labour politician (died 1970)
 29 September – Billy Butlin, holiday camp pioneer (born in South Africa; died 1980)
 3 November
 Ralph Bates, writer (died 2000) 
Pauline Johnson, born Katherine Johnson, silent film actress (died 1947)
 22 November – Philip Mayne, Army officer (died 2007)
 2 December
 John Barbirolli, orchestral conductor (died 1970)
 John Cobb, racing car and motorboat driver (died 1952)
 8 December – Arthur Leslie, television actor (died 1970)
 15 December – Harold Abrahams, athlete (died 1978)
 16 December – Noël Coward, actor, playwright and composer (died 1973)

Deaths

 30 January – Harry Bates, sculptor (born 1850)
 6 February – Alfred, Hereditary Prince of Saxe-Coburg and Gotha (Prince Alfred of Edinburgh), a grandson of Queen Victoria, in Austria (born 1874)
 27 March – Myles Birket Foster, illustrator and watercolour painter (born 1825)
 1 April – John Ferguson Nisbet, Scottish journalist and writer (born 1851)
 24 May – William Brett, 1st Viscount Esher, law lord (born 1817)
 5 June – Margaret Anna Cusack, religious sister (born 1829 in Ireland)
 9 August – Edward Frankland, chemist (born 1825)
 26 August – Walter Simon Andrews, policeman (Whitechapel murders) (born 1847)
 2 September – Ernest Renshaw, tennis player (born 1861)
 2 October 
 Emma Hardinge Britten, spiritualist (born 1823)
 Percy Pilcher, aviation pioneer and glider pilot (born 1866)
 30 October – Arthur Blomfield, ecclesiastical architect (born 1829)
 2 November – Anna Swanwick, feminist writer (born 1813)
 20 November – Georgina Gascoyne-Cecil, Marchioness of Salisbury, political hostess (born 1827)
 23 November – Thomas Henry Ismay, shipowner (White Star Line) (born 1837)
 5 December – Sir Henry Tate, sugar magnate (born 1819)

See also
 List of British films before 1920

References

 
Years of the 19th century in the United Kingdom